Michael Arthur Gilkes (5 November 1933 – 14 April 2020) was a Caribbean literary critic, dramatist, poet, filmmaker and university lecturer. He was involved in theatre for more than 40 years, as a director, actor and playwright, winning the Guyana Prize for Drama in 1992 and 2006, as well as the Guyana Prize for Best Book of Poetry in 2002. He was also respected for his insight into and writings on the work of Wilson Harris.

Biography
Gilkes was born in Georgetown, British Guiana (now Guyana). His involvement with theatre began in his native Guyana when he was about 12 years old, working in school theatre, and he went on to become involved with the Theatre Guild of Guyana.

Gilkes taught at a number of universities in the Caribbean, Canada and the United Kingdom over the past 40 years, including at the University of Kent at Canterbury, the University of Warwick, the University of Guyana, the University of the West Indies (where he served as Reader in English and Head of the English department) in Barbados and the Sir Arthur Lewis Community College in St. Lucia. He was a Quillian Visiting professor at Randolph-Macon Woman's College. In Bermuda he directed plays and taught a theatre workshop put on by the Department of Community & Cultural Affairs at The Berkeley Institute.

His work includes Couvade: A Dream-play of Guyana (published 1974), Wilson Harris and the Caribbean Novel (1975), and The Literate Imagination: Essays on the Novels of Wilson Harris (1989). An unfinished project that Gilkes was working on was the film Maira and the Jaguar People, set in the Rupununi in 2016, with a cast mainly featuring the indigenous Makushi population of Surama.

His play Couvade was first performed at the first Carifesta in 1972, and in 1978 was produced at the Keskidee Centre in London, directed by Rufus Collins, with a cast including Imruh Caesar and others.

Gilkes died in London on 14 April 2020, aged 86, after contracting COVID-19.

Awards
His play A Pleasant Career, about the life and fiction of Edgar Mittelholzer, won the Guyana Prize for Drama in 1992. Joanstown and other poems, a collection of poetry, won the Guyana Prize for Best Book of Poetry in 2002. Gilkes won the Guyana Prize for Drama again in 2006 for his play The Last of the Redmen.

Selected bibliography
 Couvade: a dream-play of Guyana, Longman Caribbean, 1974
 Wilson Harris and the Caribbean Novel, Longman Caribbean, 1975
 Racial Identity and Individual Consciousness in the Caribbean Novel, 1975. (Edgar Mittelholzer memorial lectures)
 The West Indian Novel, Twayne, 1981
 Creative Schizophrenia: The Caribbean Cultural Challenge, Centre for Caribbean Studies, University of Warwick, 1987
 The Literate Imagination: Essays on the Novels of Wilson Harris, Macmillan Education, 1989, 
 Joanstown and Other Poems, Peepal Tree Press, 2002, 
 Two Plays: Couvade & A Pleasant Career (Caribbean Modern Classics), Peepal Tree Press, 2014, 
 Heart / Land: Poems on Love & Landscape, 2015,

References

External links
"Michael Gilkes discusses the role of the arts in personal and social development", Kaieteur News Online, 15 November 2009.
. "THE LAST OF THE REDMEN is a one-man tour-de-force theatre event about the plus and minus of the colonial experience in Guyana - the 'middle man' experience of growing up in the 40s and 50s. Michael plays everybody."
 Kim Lucas, "Dr Michael Gilkes – self-professed Mudhead", Stabroek News, 1 February 2003.
 "The autobiography of William Alfred Gilkes". 
 "Interview with Michael Gilkes", Repeating Islands, 15 March 2010.

University of the West Indies academics
Guyanese writers
Afro-Guyanese people
1933 births
Guyanese dramatists and playwrights
20th-century dramatists and playwrights
20th-century male writers
20th-century Guyanese writers
2020 deaths
Deaths from the COVID-19 pandemic in England